Saraiki culture is the culture of the Saraiki people, residing in Pakistan and outside Pakistan. The region of Southern Punjab is renowned for its Sufi heritage. The city of Multan is known as the city of saints. It has the shrines of Baha-ud-din Zakariya and Shah Rukn-e-Alam. Similarly, Uch Sharif has been the centre of Qadiriyya Sufi order.

Clothing

The traditional dress of Saraiki People is the Shalwar kameez that usually they wear and which is the national dress of Pakistan. Traditional Sajarak is an important part of male and female dress.

Cuisine
Mango is a seasonal fruit of the region during summers. Sohan halwa is a traditional speciality of southern Punjab, particularly Multan. The southern Punjab cities of Dera Ghazi Khan, Bahawalpur, Uch Sharif and Mailsi are also known for their sohan halwa products. Multani Chaamp is a meat dish consisting of lamb chops prepared with various flavours and spices, placed on sewers and grilled over charcoal.

Art and music

Jhumar

Jhumar or Jhoomar (also called Ghumbar in Sandalbar area) is a traditional Saraiki and Baloch dance in Pakistan. It is also popular in the Sandalbar areas of Punjab. It is slower and more rhythmic form. The word  "Jhumar" comes from Jhum/Jhoom, which means Swaying. Jhumar is performed at the wedding ceremonies usually. The dance is also performed in circle, to the tune of emotional songs.

Saraiki literature

Khawaja Ghulam Farid (1845–1901; his famous collection is Deewan-e-Farid) and Sachal Sar Mast (1739–1829) are the most celebrated Sufi poets in Saraiki and their poems known as Kafi are still famous.

Shakir Shujabadi (Kalam-e-Shakir, Khuda Janey, Shakir Diyan Ghazlan, Peelay Patr, Munafqan Tu Khuda Bachaway, and Shakir De Dohray are his famous books) is a very well recognized modern poet.

Famous singers who have performed in Saraiki include Attaullah Khan Essa Khailwi, Pathanay Khan, Abida Parveen, Ustad Muhammad Juman, Mansoor Malangi, Talib Hussain Dard, Kamal Mahsud, and The Sketches. Many modern Pakistan singers such as Hadiqa Kiyani and Ali Zafar have also sung Saraiki folk songs. 

The Department of Saraiki, Islamia University, Bahawalpur was established in 1989 and the Department of Saraiki, Bahauddin Zakariya University, Multan was established in 2006. Saraiki is taught as a subject in schools and colleges at higher secondary, intermediate and degree level. The Allama Iqbal Open University at Islamabad, and the Al-Khair University at Bhimbir have Pakistani Linguistics Departments. They offer M.Phil. and Ph.D in Saraiki. The Associated Press of Pakistan has launched a Saraiki version of its site, as well.

Saraiki is written using the Arabic-derived Urdu alphabet with the addition of seven diacritically modified letters to represent the implosives and the extra nasals. In Sindh the Sindhi alphabet is used. The calligraphic styles used are Naskh and Nastaʿlīq.

Historically, traders or bookkeepers wrote in a script known as kiṛakkī or laṇḍā, although use of this script has been significantly reduced in recent times. Likewise, a script related to the Landa scripts family, known as Multani, was previously used to write Saraiki. A preliminary proposal to encode the Multani script in ISO/IEC 10646 was submitted in 2011.

See also
South-Punjab
Saraiki people 
List of Saraiki people
Saraiki cuisine
Saraiki diaspora
List of Seraiki tribes
Saraiki literature

References